Funding Council may refer to:

 Higher Education Funding Council for England, a public body of the Department for Business, Innovation and Skills in the United Kingdom
 Higher Education Funding Council for Wales, an intermediary body in Wales
 Scottish Funding Council, the body in Scotland that distributes funding from the Scottish Executive to the country's colleges